Justice Bonner may refer to:

John W. Bonner, associate justice of the Montana Supreme Court
Micajah H. Bonner, associate justice of the Texas Supreme Court